Baron Pierrepont is a title that has been created four times in British history. The first creation came in the Peerage of England on 29 June 1627 when Sir Robert Pierrepont was created Baron Pierrepont, also being created Viscount Newark at the same time. He was further created Earl of Kingston-upon-Hull in 1628. The fifth Earl was created Duke of Kingston-upon-Hull in 1715 in the Peerage of Great Britain, with the Dukedom becoming extinct on the death of the second Duke in 1773.

The second creation came in the Peerage of Ireland on 29 March 1702 when Gervase Pierrepont was created Baron Pierrepont, of Ardglass, County Down. On 19 October 1714 he was also made Baron Pierrepont, of Hanslope in the County of Buckingham, in the Peerage of Great Britain, being the third creation of the title, with this creation giving Gervase Pierrepont an automatic seat in the House of Lords. He was the third son of the Honourable William Pierrepont, second son of Robert Pierrepont, 1st Earl of Kingston-upon-Hull. The titles became extinct on his death on 22 May 1715.

The fourth creation came in the Peerage of Great Britain on 23 July 1796 when Charles Pierrepont was made Baron Pierrepont, of Holme Pierrepont in the County of Nottingham. He was made Viscount Newark, of Newark on Trent, at the same time. Born Charles Medows, he was the son of Philip Medows and Lady Frances, daughter of William Pierrepont, Earl of Kingston, eldest son and heir apparent of Evelyn Pierrepont, 1st Duke of Kingston-upon-Hull. In 1788 he succeeded to the Pierrepont estates and assumed by Royal sign manual the same year the surname of Pierrepont in lieu of Medows. In 1806 he was further honoured when he was created Earl Manvers. All these titles became extinct on the death of the sixth Earl Manvers in 1955.

Barons Pierrepont; first creation (1627)
 Robert Pierrepont, 1st Baron Pierrepont (1584–1643) (created Earl of Kingston-upon-Hull in 1628)
 For further succession, see Earl of Kingston-upon-Hull

Baron Pierrepont, of Ardglass, and of Hanslope; second and third creations (1702 and 1714)
Gervase Pierrepont, 1st Baron Pierrepont, of Ardglass (1649–1715) (further created Baron Pierrepont, of Hanslope in 1714)

Barons Pierrepont, of Holme Pierrepont; fourth creation (1796)
 Charles Pierrepont, 1st Baron Pierrepont, of Holme Pierrepont (1737–1816) (created Earl Manvers in 1806)
 For further succession, see Earl Manvers

References

1627 establishments in England
Noble titles created in 1627
Extinct baronies in the Peerage of England
Noble titles created in 1702
Extinct baronies in the Peerage of Ireland
Noble titles created in 1714
Noble titles created in 1796
Extinct baronies in the Peerage of Great Britain